The University of Computer Studies, Yangon (UCSY), located in the outskirts of Yangon in Hlawga, is the leading IT and computer science university of Myanmar. The university, administered by the Ministry of Education, offers undergraduate and graduate degree programs in computer science and technology. The language of instruction at UCSY is English. Along with the University of Computer Studies, Mandalay, UCSY is one of two premier universities specializing in computer studies, and also one of the most selective universities in the country.

Many of the country's middle and upper level personnel in government and industry are graduates of
UCSY.

History
UCSY's origins trace back to the founding of the Universities' Computer Center (UCC) in 1971 at the Hlaing Campus of Yangon University. Equipped with ICL ICL 1902S and with the help of distinguished visiting professors from US, UK and Europe,  UCC provided computer education and training to university and government employees. In 1973, it began offering a master's degree program (MSc in Computer Science), and a graduate diploma program (Diploma in Automated Computing) in cooperation with the Mathematics Department of Yangon University. The center added DEC PDP-11/70 mini-computers in 1983, and personal computers in 1990. In 1986, the center added B.C.Sc. (Bachelor of Computer Science) and B.C.Tech. (Bachelor of Computer Technology) degree programs.

In March 1988, the Institute of Computer Science and Technology (ICST) was established, and began offering bachelor's degree programs in Computer Science. In 1993, it started an internationally accepted International Diploma in Computer Studies (IDCS) program with the help of UK's the National Computing Centre (NCC). On 1 January 1997, the university's control was transferred from the Ministry of Education to the Ministry Science and Technology. On 1 July 1998, it was renamed the University of Computer Studies, Yangon. A graduate school with master's and PhD degree programs was established in May 2001.

Programs
UCSY offers five-year bachelor's and two-year master's degree programs in computer science and computer technology. The school also offers a two-year post-graduate diploma and a three-year Ph.D. program in computer science and information technology. The school's language of instruction is English.

Faculties
 Faculty of Computer Systems and Technologies
 Faculty of Computer Science
 Faculty of Information Science
 Faculty of Computing

Supporting departments
 Department of Japanese
 Department of English
 Department of Natural Science
 Department of Information Technology Operations

Research labs
 Natural Language Processing Lab
 Geographic Information System Lab
 Image Processing Lab
 Mobile and Wireless Computing Lab
 Embedded System Lab
 Cyber Security Research Lab
 Cisco Network Lab
 Cloud Computing Lab
 Artificial Intelligence Lab
 Computer Graphics and Visualization
 Database System Lab
 Software Engineering Lab
 Numerical Analysis Lab
 Operation Research Lab
 UCSY-Ishibashi Lab

International Collaboration
The university is known for working with international universities, research institutes and international governmental organizations.

Affiliations

Universities
 Keio University of Japan
 Nagoya Institute of Technology 
 University of Miyazaki 
 Handong Global University 
 National Institute of Information and Communications Technology 
 University of Computer Studies, Mandalay (UCSM)

Other universities
The following universities of computer studies are officially affiliated with UCSY. Their qualified graduates can continue their advanced studies at UCSY.

 Computer University, Bamaw
 Computer University, Dawei
 Computer University, Hinthada
 Computer University, Kalay
 Computer University, Kyaingtong
 Computer University, Loikaw
 Computer University, Lashio
 University of Computer Studies (Maubin)
 Computer University, Magway
 Computer University, Thaton
 University of Computer Studies, Mandalay
 Computer University, Mandalay
 Computer University, Monywa
 Computer University, Myeik
 Computer University, Meiktila
 Computer University, Myitkyina
 Computer University, Pathein
 Computer University, Pakokku
 Computer University, Hpa-An
 Computer University, Pyay
 Computer University, Pinlon
 Computer University, Sittwe
 University of Computer Studies (Taungoo)
 University of Computer Studies, Taunggyi

Alumni
There are currently expected to be more than 8000 alumni members. Among the alumni of UCSY, they have become leading educators, developers, PMPs, politicians, businessmen, writers, architects, athletes, actors, musicians, and those that have gained both national and international fame. Among notable alumni, just to name a few, are Dr. Mie Mie Thet Thwin, Rector UCSY; Dr. Saw Sandar Aye, Rector UIT; Dr. Moe Pwint, University of Computer Studies, Mandalay; Dr. Win Aye, Myanmar Institute of Information Technology; Dr. Thinn Thu Naing, University of Computer Studies; Min Maw Kun, Myanmar Academy Award-winning film actor; and many.

References

External links
 School site: Official website of UCSY

Educational institutions established in 1988
Universities and colleges in Yangon
Technological universities in Myanmar
1988 establishments in Burma